Lily Fabiola de la Rosa Cortés (born 11 March 1970) is a Mexican politician from the Institutional Revolutionary Party. From 2011 to 2012 she served as Deputy of the LXI Legislature of the Mexican Congress representing Coahuila.

References

1970 births
Living people
Politicians from Saltillo
Women members of the Chamber of Deputies (Mexico)
Institutional Revolutionary Party politicians
21st-century Mexican politicians
21st-century Mexican women politicians
Deputies of the LXI Legislature of Mexico
Members of the Chamber of Deputies (Mexico) for Coahuila